Adéyẹmí is a Yoruba name that means "the crown or royalty befits me". It could also mean crown is meant for me. The popular Yorùbá prefix "Adé" which means "Crown" is typically reserved for people born into any Yorùbá royal family.

Given name
 Adeyemi Abayomi, Nigerian boxer
 Adeyemi Afolahan, Nigerian Navy admiral
 Adeyemi Afolayan, Nigerian actor
 Adeyemi I Alowolodu, last ruler of the Oyo Empire
 Adeyemi Ikuforiji, Nigerian politician
 Adeyemi Olayemi, Nigerian politician

Surname
 Karim Adeyemi, German footballer
 Kunlé Adeyemi, Nigerian architect
 Tom Adeyemi, English footballer
 Tomi Adeyemi, American author
 Walé Adeyemi, British fashion designer

See also 
 Adeyemo

References 

Yoruba given names
Yoruba-language surnames